The 1982–83 Iowa Hawkeyes men's basketball team represented the University of Iowa in the 1982–83 NCAA Division I men's basketball season as members of the Big Ten Conference. The team was led by head coach Lute Olson, coaching in his ninth and final season at the school, and played their home games at the Iowa Field House and Carver–Hawkeye Arena (opened January 1983) in Iowa City, Iowa.

The Hawkeyes finished the season at 21–10 overall, fifth in the Big Ten  and received an at-large bid to the  NCAA tournament as the seventh seed in the Midwest regional. After wins over Utah State and second seed Missouri, Iowa lost to third-seeded Villanova in the Sweet Sixteen.

Previous season 
The Hawkeyes finished the 1981–82 season at 21–8, 12–6 in Big Ten play to finish in a three-way tie for second place. They received an at-large bid to the  NCAA tournament and were seeded sixth in West regional. Iowa defeated  Northeast Louisiana in the first  then lost in overtime to eighth-ranked Idaho, the third seed.

Roster

Schedule and results

|-
!colspan=9 style=|Non-conference regular season
|-

|-
!colspan=9 style=|Big Ten regular season

|-
!colspan=9 style=|NCAA Tournament

Rankings

NBA Draft

References

Iowa
Iowa
Iowa Hawkeyes men's basketball seasons
Hawkeyes
Hawkeyes